José Moya del Piño (1891–1969) was a Spanish-born American painter, muralist and educator. He associated with the Post-impressionists of Spain and the Depression-era muralists in the San Francisco Bay Area. He taught classes at the San Francisco Art Students League, San Francisco Art Institute and the College of Marin.

Early life and education 
José Moya del Pino was born in 1891 in Priego de Cordoba, Spain. He studied art at the Royal Academy of Fine Arts of San Fernando in Madrid from 1908 until 1911. He had won the Prix de Rome scholarship, but decided to go to Paris instead. He studied in 1911 at the Académie Colarossi.

Career 
After World War I broke out (around 1916), he returned to Spain. He made numerous portraits for the Spanish nobility and bourgeoisie and by 1925, King Alfonso XIII of Spain had appointed Moya director of the "Spanish artistic mission" to foster appreciation of Spanish art and culture in America. Moya del Pino and two other distinguished members of the Spanish Court brought over 50 paintings for exhibitions in Philadelphia, New York, Washington, D.C., and San Francisco.

The King had given Moya del Pino the commission to copy all of the paintings of Velázquez hanging in the Prado Museum in Madrid. Among the paintings collected for exhibition were the 41Velázquez reproductions. Moya del Pino had labored for four years on this project: measuring, studying, grinding pigments, and mixing colors according to 17th Century recipes in order to duplicate the original canvases as exactly as possible. In subsequent years, when civil war in Spain threatened the original masterpieces of Velázquez, Moya del Pino's work gained in importance.

He moved to San Francisco during the late 1920s and taught at the San Francisco Art Students League (a cooperative space featuring an art gallery, art classes, and art supply store founded by fellow artist Ray Strong), The California School of Fine Arts (now called the San Francisco Art Institute; from 1937 until 1940) and the College of Marin (in the 1950s and early 1960s). He was also involved with the founding of the Marin Art and Garden Center in Ross, California, and served as the first vice president.

In 1929, he married Helen Pauline Horst, daughter of Emil Clemens Horst in San Francisco. After marriage together they lived at 3820 Washington Street in Presidio Heights, San Francisco.

He was known for his portraiture but he also painted murals for post offices around the Bay Area (1936–1941) as well as contributing a mural in the lobby of Coit Tower as part of the Public Works of Art Project in 1934.

In 1933, Moya del Pino painted murals and managed the lavish interior design for the rathskeller (a basement tasting room) at the Aztec Brewing Company in San Diego. In November 1935, Moya del Pino painted three murals in the boardroom at Acme Brewing Company at 762 Fulton Street, San Francisco. The Acme Brewing Company building was demolished in 1990, however the Moya del Pino murals were moved and currently live at the Logan Heights Library in San Diego.

He had stopped painting in 1961, due to a long-term illness.

Death and legacy 
Moya del Pino died in Ross, California, on March 7, 1969, and was buried at Mount Olivet Catholic Cemetery in San Rafael, California. He was survived by two daughters and one son, and his wife Helen.

The Marin Art and Garden Center's Octagon House contains the Jose Moya del Pino library.

See also 
 List of United States post office murals

References

External links 
 
 Oral history interview with José Moya del Pino, from September 10, 1964 (from Archives of American Art, Smithsonian Institution)

American muralists
1891 births
1969 deaths
San Francisco Art Institute faculty
College of Marin faculty
20th-century American painters
American male painters
Académie Colarossi alumni
20th-century American male artists
Spanish emigrants to the United States

Public Works of Art Project artists
Section of Painting and Sculpture artists